Robin Anthony Barnett CMG (born 8 March 1958) is a British diplomat, who served as the British ambassador to Ireland, Poland, and Romania.

Early life 
Robin Anthony Barnett was born on 8 March 1958 to Bryan Anderson Barnett and Marion Barnett.

Barnett attended the University of Birmingham, graduating with a Bachelor of Laws in 1979.

Career 
Barnett joined the Foreign and Commonwealth Office in 1980.

Ambassador to Romania 
Barnett was appointed the British Ambassador to Romania in 2006, and served in this role until 2010.

Ambassador to Poland 
Barnett served as the British Ambassador to Poland from 2011 to 2016.

Ambassador to Ireland 
He succeeded Dominick Chilcott as Ambassador to Ireland in 2016.

Personal life 
Barnett married his first wife, Debra Marianne Bunt, in 1989. The marriage was dissolved in 1999.

Barnett married his second wife, Tesca Marie Osman, in 1999.

Barnett has a son and a stepson.

He is a supporter of Manchester United. Barnett had a framed Manchester United jersey, signed by Roy Keane, on his office wall during his time as ambassador to Ireland.

Honours
He was appointed Companion of the Order of St Michael and St George (CMG) in the 2006 New Year Honours list.

References 

Living people
1958 births
20th-century British diplomats
21st-century British diplomats
Ambassadors of the United Kingdom to Ireland
Ambassadors of the United Kingdom to Poland
Alumni of the University of Birmingham
Companions of the Order of St Michael and St George